Lee Nak-yon (born 20 December 1952), also known as Lee Nak-yeon, is a South Korean politician who served as the 41st Prime Minister of South Korea from 2017 to 2020. A member of the Democratic Party of Korea, he is the longest-serving prime minister since the Constitution of South Korea was last revised in 1987. Lee previously held the governorship of Jeollanam-do (South Jeolla) province from 2014 to 2017, a stronghold of his party. Before serving as governor, he worked as a journalist for over 20 years and served as a member of the National Assembly for four terms.

Lee was chosen for the position of Prime Minister by President Moon Jae-in to keep his campaign promise to appoint his de facto deputy from Honam region. During his tenure as Prime Minister, Lee became well-known for his forceful exchanges with opposition party leaders and adeptness at communicating with citizens. Prior to and following his victory in the crucial Jongno district in the 2020 legislative election against conservative Hwang Kyo-ahn, another probable presidential candidate, he was once considered a likely nominee of the Democratic Party in the 2022 South Korean presidential election. He lost the primary to Lee Jae-myung in October 2021.

Early life and education 
Lee was born on 20 December 1952 in Yeonggwang County in South Jeolla Province. He is the 22nd generation descendant of Grand Prince Wanpung, the 1st son of Yi Jachun as well the older brother of Taejo who is known to be the first King of Joseon. After graduating from Seoul National University with a degree in law, he shortly worked at investment trust. From the late 1970s to 2000, he worked as a journalist for the daily Dong-a Ilbo newspaper for 21 years. From 1989 to 1993, he was stationed in Tokyo as its correspondent during which he reported the inauguration of new Japanese monarch Akihito.

Early political career
Lee entered politics in 2000 "based on his ties with former President Kim Dae-jung he formed while covering politics." Following his departure from the Dong-a Ilbo he was elected as a member of the National Assembly in 2000 and served for four terms. He also served as a spokesperson for former President Roh Moo-hyun when Roh was the president-elect in 2002. Roh chose Lee's draft speech for his presidential inauguration among multiple drafts and delivered the speech without changing a word Lee wrote. Lee was only one of two parliamentarians who voted against the impeachment of President Roh despite of different party membership. Lee is seen as having close ties with key Japanese politicians, having served many years as a senior member in the Korea-Japan Parliamentarians' Union. Lee speaks fluent Japanese.

He left office in the middle of his fourth term in 2014 to successfully run for governor of South Jeolla Province. Lee received around 60% approval rating throughout his term before leaving the office in May 2017. In addition to securing unprecedented amount of investment to the least developed region in the country, Lee is well known for introducing "100 won taxi" policy which improved mobility of its citizens by funding taxis to drive its citizens to the nearest bus stop for 100 won which is less than a dime. He is also known for his love of Makgeolli, a Korean traditional rice wine, which he used to facilitate communication with his provincial government employees who nicknamed him "Manager Lee" for his attention to detail.

Prime Minister 
On his first day in office, President Moon nominated Lee as his first Prime Minister of South Korea right after his inaugural ceremony. Lee resigned from South Jeolla Provincial Governorship on the same day. Until Lee's nomination was confirmed by the parliament, Hwang Kyo-ahn, the last prime minister under impeached-and-removed president Park Geun-hye, kept his place. Lee referenced Makgeolli when emphasising his intention to work with opposition parties and for the people.

On 25 June, Lee urged North Korea to release their prisoners. On 27 July, he criticized the accord regarding ‘comfort women’. On 16 August, Lee reacted negatively to calls for South Korea to possess nuclear weapons, saying the move would undermine Seoul's calls for North Korea to denuclearize, trigger a nuclear arms race and put the country under international sanctions. Reflecting such calls, the main opposition Liberty Korea Party adopted a demand for the redeployment of US tactical nuclear arms as its official party line during a general meeting of its lawmakers. On 29 November, Lee raised concerns that cryptocurrencies were corrupting the youth of South Korea, remarking “There are cases in which young Koreans including students are jumping in to make quick money and virtual currencies are used in illegal activities like drug dealing or multi-level marketing for frauds”.

Leader of the Democratic Party

2020 South Korean legislative election 
In 2020 election, Lee stood for Jongno constituency and defeated the UFP President Hwang Kyo-ahn. He took two roles in his party - co-chair of 2020 general election campaign with the other co-chair being then-party leader Lee Hae-chan and the chair of the committee "to overcome the national crisis" caused by Covid-19 pandemic. With the party leader Lee Hae-chan hospitalised, Lee traveled across the nation to support his party candidates and was regarded as the de facto commander of his party's campaign in the election. The party increased its share at the parliament to a level that it does not require other parties' votes for enacting the laws.

2020 Democratic Party of Korea leadership election 
In July 2020 Lee announced his campaign for the leader of his party, Democratic Party, highlighting his experiences dealing with "crises" that are much needed in transitioning into post-covid 19 era. If elected, Lee is likely to serve as party leader for 7 months - less than a half of its fixed tenure - following the party rule that mandates party's presidential candidate to resign from party leadership. In this regards, Lee stressed his passion for his calling to be the party leader that he will work like a "flame" during these period. In August 2020 he was elected as the party leader earning more than half of votes in every category - party delegates, its members, non-voting members and public opinion polls.

COVID-19 Response 
He relaunched the Covid-19 committee to support the government's efforts to contain the virus and prepare for "post-Covid-19 era." With President Moon praising the relationship between the government and the ruling party "fantastic," they quickly concluded long-debated issue of secondary COVID-19 relief fund that it should be given to those who are more severely impacted by the pandemic not to all people, which was strongly argued by Gyeonggi Provincial Governor Lee Jae-myung, another presidential contender of his party. The "Covid-19 committee" was merged with "K New Deal committee" which was also installed to support government's efforts to revitalise the economy and boost its transition into digital and green society.

Reforming the Party

Supreme Council and Cabinet 
He appointed senior posts of his party including two remaining members of its Supreme Council he can appoint. Designation of 24-years-old Park Seong-min as one of Supreme Council members surprised many. He also created four spokesperson posts for specific issues - youth, security, economy and international affairs.

Ethics and Reforming the Party 
On 16 September he launched the independent investigative body of the party to produce reports on alleged misconduct of its members to its ethics committee for disciplinary actions as promised during leadership campaign and appointed former judge Choi Ki-sang, assembly member from Geumcheon District, as its chair. The first members to be investigated are Lee Sang-jik and Kim Hong-gul. Lee is accused of several allegations linked to Eastar Jet he founded and Kim his real estate in Seoul. Yoon Mee-hyang who was recruited by the party for her advocacy work for "comfort women" and now accused of using donations for her own gain will not be investigated as she is already indicted by the state prosecutor and suspended of party membership and titles. On 18 September Lee tabled a motion to expel Kim who is a son of Kim Dae-jung, the first President the party has ever produced, and was recruited for his work on inter-Korean relations in civil societies for refusing to cooperate with the investigative body to the Supreme Council and it was adopted.

In October 2020, Lee brought up the idea of "committee to reform the party" which resembles one led by Kim Sang-gon in 2015 under then-party leader Moon Jae-in. If installed, it is likely to be tasked with introducing measures to reform the nomination process, strengthen its ethics code and prepare the longevity of the party. On 14 October, the party's Supreme Council passed the motion to establish such committee and appoint Kim Jong-min as its chairperson.

Task forces 
In September 2020, as part of Lee's party leader campaign promise to transform the party vigilant to societal issues and prepare the country's future, Lee launched seven task forces dedicated to specific issues from power institution and political reforms to youth affairs and industrial safety and appointed Supreme Council members apart from himself and floor leader as their chairpersons by their expertise. He also launched one for social tragedy countermeasures led by an assembly member from Ansan, Jeon Hae-cheol, who previously chaired party's Sewol disaster committee.

In October the party founded "Korean Peninsula Task force (Korean: 한반도TF)" to support ongoing momentum in Korean peninsula towards peace irrespective of leadership changes in Japan and United States and appointed senior assembly members with expertise in foreign and inter-korean relations as its members and Song Young-gil, the chair of the Assembly's Foreign and Unification Committee, its chair.

2021 South Korean by-elections 
Lee will lead the party's campaign in local by-elections in April 2021 - most prominently in two of the country's populous cities of Seoul and Busan - as a co-standing head of the campaign with the other being the party's floor leader Kim Tae-nyeon. He will also lead the party's temporary special committee for new airport on Busan's Gadeokdo Island ensuring its construction and operation by 2030 World Expo in Busan upon newly passed special law on this new airport and as part of development strategy of the country's southeastern region.

Legislative achievements 
During his time as party leader, the National Assembly passed the budget for year 2021 within the constitutionally mandated deadline - the first time to do so in six years. During his "flame"-like 6 months, the Democratic Party passed a total of 422 laws with or without the support from the opposition parties which include key reforms bill such as revising the laws for Corruption Investigation Office for High-ranking Officials and National Intelligence Service. Lee described these achievements as the biggest reforms taken into effect since 1987, the year of June Struggle and the latest Constitution revision as such reforms were often blocked by opposition parties in the parliament.

Presidential campaign 
On 9 March 2021, exactly a year before the 2022 South Korean presidential election, Lee resigned from the leader of his party triggering leadership by-election and effectively announcing his candidacy for president. He will continue to lead party's campaign in local by-elections in April 2021. After the party's defeat in this election, all remaining members of the party leadership resigned. Lee announced he will have some time for self-reflection. After new leadership members were elected in May 2021, he met with representatives of SMEs and large corporations urging them to take part in solving youth unemployment and breaking his silence.

In October 2021, he lost the party primary to Lee Jae-myung.

Personal life 
Lee is married with a son. Lee Nak-yon's bongwan is the Jeonju Yi clan. He is also the 22nd-generation descendant of Grand Prince Wanpung who was the elder half-brother of King Taejo of Joseon, the founder of Joseon Kingdom. He is a member of the South Korean Presbyterian Church.

Electoral history

References

External links
 Lee Nak-yon on Twitter

|-

|-

|-

|-

1952 births
Jeonju Yi clan
Living people
Members of the National Assembly (South Korea)
Minjoo Party of Korea politicians
People from South Jeolla Province
Prime Ministers of South Korea
Seoul National University School of Law alumni
South Korean journalists